The Middlewood Trust is an organization located in Roeburndale, Lancaster, Lancashire, United Kingdom, which advances research and provides education on permaculture techniques for agriculture, forestry, wildlife and countryside management.

History 
The Middlewood Trust has been staffed by volunteers for the past thirty years and volunteering remains an important part of what they do today.

Present day

Volunteering 
The current volunteer programme is focused on the permaculture vegetable garden. The center runs monthly volunteer events that have included projects such as building a new wind turbine battery shed, planting trees, coppicing, and traditional baking. Regular volunteer events take place on the second weekend of every month from January to November.

Teaching 
The Middlewood Trust hosts annual permaculture courses, including introductory short courses and a full Permaculture Design Certificate course. They also accommodate students working towards their Duke of Edinburgh Award. The center has hosted art trips and workshops.
The site has access to extensive woodlands including Roeburndale Woods (Grade 1 Site of Special Scientific Interest) and many smaller Biological Heritage sites. Historically they were managed as coppice with standards and used for charcoal, wood turning, swill oak baskets, Lancashire clogs from alder, besom birch brushes, fence posts and riven oak beams.  They contain many native species of trees including the rare small leaved lime. The woods are used for teaching the National Vegetation Classification and Permaculture courses.

Artists in residence 
The Middlewood Trust uses timber and small wood products from the woods to develop local sustainable crafts. 

In recent years they have had resident bodgers, swillers (oak basket makers), yurt makers, and some charcoal production.

Other work 
The center was one of several organizations involved with the Lancashire Apples Project (started 2005).

External links 
 The Middlewood Trust
 Middlewood Trust Facebook

References 

Organisations based in Lancashire